Donald Lee Drakeman is an American entrepreneur, venture capitalist, business executive, academic, and scholar based in South Carolina.

Career 
He has since 2007 been a venture partner in Advent Venture Partners, a venture capital firm based in London, in connection with which he is a member of the firm's Life Sciences Team. At the same time he is a Fellow in Health Management of the Judge Business School at Cambridge University, where he is a member of the Management Science Subject Group. He is in addition the chairman of the advisory council of the James Madison Program in American Ideals and Institutions at Princeton University, where he was for many years a member of the faculty and taught lecture courses and seminars on civil liberties and the United States Constitution. His book Church, State, and Original Intent, which concerns the establishment clause of the First Amendment to the United States Constitution, was published by Cambridge University Press in 2010. In 2015 Palgrave Macmillan published Why We Need the Humanities, which focuses on the relation of the humanities to the life sciences and to civil liberties.

He was educated at Dartmouth College (AB magna cum laude), Columbia Law School (JD Harlan Fiske Stone Scholar), and Princeton University (MA, PhD in Religion). In the early stages of his career he worked as an attorney at Milbank, Tweed, Hadley & McCloy and was the vice-president of the Essex Chemical Corporation. He is best known as the co-founder of two biotechnology companies, Medarex Inc. and Genmab A/S, both of which develop drugs used in monoclonal antibody therapy. During his tenure as CEO of Medarex, the company raised more than a billion dollars, entered into alliances with many other pharmaceutical companies, and spun off Genmab, which subsequently completed the largest biotechnology IPO in the history of European capital markets up to the time of the offering. He was an Ernst & Young Entrepreneur of the Year in 2005.

He serves as a trustee of Drew University, a Visitor of Ralston College, a member of the Board of Advisors of the Rutgers Business School, and formerly served as a trustee of the University of Charleston. He is also a member of the editorial board of the journal mAbs. He was formerly the chairman of the New Jersey Commission on Science and Technology, and has served on the boards of several companies, including Oxford Glycosciences, IDM-Pharma, and Mannkind. He continues to be a Director of Zymeworks Inc. He is in addition a Fellow of the Burgon Society.

References

External links 
 Donald Drakeman on Religion's Place in Public Schools
 Donald Drakeman on the Humanities and Social Sciences
 A Panel Discussion of Donald L. Drakeman's Church, State, and Original Intent
 Donald Drakeman on the Separation of Church and State
 The Future of Monoclonal Antibody Technology
 Genmab A/S
 The Ernst & Young Entrepreneur Hall of Fame
 The University of Charleston
 The Rutgers Business School

American venture capitalists
American religion academics
Academics of the University of Cambridge
Dartmouth College alumni
Columbia Law School alumni
Princeton University alumni
Businesspeople in the pharmaceutical industry
First Amendment to the United States Constitution
1953 births
Living people
People associated with Milbank, Tweed, Hadley & McCloy